The men's standing triple jump was a track & field athletics event at the 1900 Summer Olympics in Paris, France. It was held on July 16, 1900. 10 athletes from four nations competed in the standing triple jump. The event was won by Ray Ewry of the United States, who took gold in all three of the standing jumps in 1900 (and in all three in 1900 and in both that remained on the programme in each of the 1904, 1906 Intercalated, and 1908 Games). His teammate Irving Baxter earned silver in all three 1900 standing jumps. The American sweep was completed with Robert Garrett taking bronze.

Background

This was the first appearance of the event, which was held twice in 1900 and 1904 (in contrast to the other standing jumps, which continued to be held in 1908 and 1912).

Competition format

There was a single round of jumping. The rules for the jump are not known; the event was called the "hop, step, and jump" at the time but it appears that jumpers could use three standing long jumps rather than a continuous movement.

Records

There were no standing world or Olympic records at the time. Ray Ewry set the first Olympic record in this event with 10.58 metres.

Schedule

Results

Ewry won all three of the standing jumps, with Baxter in second each time. The standing triple jump was the most international of the three, with four countries competing. All of the competitors in the standing triple jump except the medallists also competed in the regular triple jump.

References

Sources
 International Olympic Committee.
 De Wael, Herman. Herman's Full Olympians: "Athletics 1900". Accessed 18 March 2006.

Men's jumping z standing triple
Triple jump at the Olympics